Vishal Sikka (born May, 1967) is the Founder and CEO of Vianai, former CTO of SAP AG, and former CEO of Infosys. He currently also serves on Oracle's board of directors, the supervisory board of the BMW Group and as an advisor to the Stanford Institute of Human-Centered AI.

His current endeavor, Vianai, is a startup based in the San Francisco Bay Area that provides advanced technological software and services in Artificial Intelligence and Machine Learning to large companies around the world.

Prior, Sikka served as Executive Vice Chairman, CEO, and MD of Infosys. On 18 August 2017 he stepped down as managing director of Infosys. He left his role as Executive Vice Chairman of Infosys on 24 August 2017 when Nandan Nilekani was appointed as the new Non Executive Chairman of the Board. Prior to joining Infosys, Sikka was a member of the Executive Board and the Global Managing Board of SAP AG, leading all SAP products and innovation globally. In his 12 years at SAP, Sikka led SAP's product portfolio including the in-memory platform, SAP HANA, and all its applications, cloud and technology solutions. Sikka left the SAP board in May 2014, and was announced as CEO and MD of Infosys on 12 June 2014.

After three years at Infosys, Sikka left on 18 August 2017.

India Today magazine ranked him #32nd in India's 50 Most powerful people of 2017 list.

Early life and career
Sikka was born in Shajapur, Madhya Pradesh, India to Punjabi parents - an officer in the Indian Railways and a teacher. His family moved to Vadodara in Gujarat when he was six. He did his schooling in Kendriya Vidyalaya, Rajkot and thereafter at a Christian school named Rosary High School (Vadodara). Sikka joined the bachelors in Computer Engineering course at Maharaja Sayajirao University of Baroda, which he discontinued to go to Syracuse University in New York where he earned a B.S. in Computer Science. He completed his Ph.D. in 1996 from Stanford University. His dissertation was titled Integrating Specialized Procedures into Proof Systems and his thesis advisor was Michael Genesereth.

Marvin Minsky, one of the fathers of AI, wrote a recommendation letter for Sikka for his admission to Stanford. John McCarthy, also known as a father of AI, was one of Sikka's teachers.

After a brief stint at Xerox's research labs, Sikka founded iBrain which competed at the time with Business Objects. iBrain was acquired by PatternRX, Inc. His second startup, Bodha.com, focused on developing technology for non-invasive, service-based integration of enterprise applications and information. Sikka joined Peregrine Systems as their area Vice-President for Platform Technologies, responsible for application development and integration technologies and architecture, following their acquisition of Bodha.com.

SAP
Sikka joined SAP in 2002 to head up the advanced technology group responsible for strategic innovative projects. Later he was promoted to Senior Vice President of Architecture and Chief Software Architect, responsible for the road map and the direction for the architecture of SAP products and infrastructure.

In April 2007, Sikka was named SAP's first-ever CTO, reporting to then CEO Henning Kagermann. At the time, SAP spokesman Frank Hartmann stated that SAP felt it needed a CTO to oversee some broad changes that were under way at the company, including its renewed focus on the mid-market, the introduction of new on-demand products, and the continued roll out of NetWeaver and its SOA strategy.

In the wake of Léo Apotheker's resignation from the executive board in 2010 to become CEO of HP, Sikka was named to a newly reconstituted board, along with new co-CEOs Bill McDermott and Jim Hagemann Snabe.

On 4 May 2014, Sikka announced his departure from SAP for personal reasons before being named leader of Infosys.

Infosys
On 12 June 2014, Infosys Ltd, India's second-largest IT services exporter, named Sikka as its Chief Executive Officer and Managing Director. Sikka took over from then-CEO S.D. Shibulal, one of Infosys' founders, on 1 August. He was inducted as a whole-time director of the Board and CEO & MD (Designate) of Infosys on 14 June.  His annual compensation was set at $13 million and stock options worth $9million. Vishal Sikka resigned from Infosys as MD and CEO on 18 August 2017. He was replaced by Pravin Rao on 24 August 2017.

Vianai
In 2019, Sikka founded Vianai, an AI company, with $50 million in initial funding and advisors that included Indra Nooyi, John Etchemendy, Divesh Makan, Sebastian Thrun, and Alan Kay.

In a demo of the platform on Sept. 17, 2019, at Oracle Open World, Sikka revealed the company had created its own programming language to enable more developers and companies to utilize AI and Machine Learning techniques.

Oracle 
Oracle this week announced (December 2019) that Dr. Vishal Sikka, has been named to Oracle's Board of Directors. Before starting Vianai, Vishal was a top executive at SAP and the CEO of Infosys. As a part of the board, he would be providing strategic vision and expert advice on Oracle Cloud and its services.

Additional background
In 2008, Sikka joined the executive board of the CTO Forum, an influential industry non-profit community. The same year, he articulated his vision of 'Timeless Software' – software that does not cause disruption to the user as technology landscapes evolve – and proposed that this be a key pillar of SAP's future development efforts.

He has expressed his admiration for industry visionary Alan Kay and contributed a chapter to Points of View, a tribute on Kay's 70th birthday.

Sikka served as a member of the advisory board for Coghead from 2006 to 2009 along with industry influencers Steve Bourne, Guy Kawasaki and John Seely Brown. Coghead was acquired by SAP in 2009.

Sikka has been an influential advocate for HANA, SAP's new in-memory database technology. He spearheaded the development of HANA since his appointment as CTO with support from Hasso Plattner. Since assuming his seat on the executive board, he has spoken on multiple occasions about the potential of HANA as a breakthrough in the enterprise software space.

References

External links

Bloomberg Profile

Living people
1967 births
American technology chief executives
SAP SE people
Stanford University alumni
Syracuse University College of Engineering and Computer Science alumni
Maharaja Sayajirao University of Baroda alumni
American chief technology officers
Infosys people